Jean-Pierre Salignon (1 January 1928 – 9 March 2012) was a French basketball player. He competed in the men's tournament at the 1952 Summer Olympics.

References

External links
 

1928 births
2012 deaths
French men's basketball players
Olympic basketball players of France
Basketball players at the 1952 Summer Olympics
People from Aïn Témouchent Province
1950 FIBA World Championship players